The thirty-sixth series of the British medical drama television series Casualty began airing on BBC One in the United Kingdom on 14 August 2021, a week after the conclusion of the previous series. The series focuses on the professional and personal lives of medical and ancillary staff at the emergency department (ED) of the fictional Holby City Hospital. Loretta Preece continues her role as series producer and Deborah Sathe is the senior executive producer.

Production 
The series commences in the United Kingdom on 14 August 2021 on BBC One and airs on Saturday nights. It was produced by BBC Studios. Loretta Preece continues her role as series producer, while Deborah Sathe acts as the senior executive producer. On 12 November 2021, it was announced that former story producer Jon Sen would become the show's executive producer from the following month. His first episode aired on 11 June 2022. New filming techniques implemented during the previous series, as a result of the COVID-19 pandemic, meant that episode runtimes for the series were shortened from the usual 50 minutes to 40 minutes. Notable exceptions to the usual run-time are the opening episode which runs for 71 minutes., episode 39 which runs for 80 minutes and episode 43 which lasts 75 minutes.

Promotion 
The series was promoted through multiple trailers and each episode received a preview clip before broadcast. A trailer was released on 15 July 2021 to promote Richard Winsor's return as Caleb Knight as part of the opening episode. On 2 August 2021, another trailer was released previewing the opening episode. Rhys Freeman from Planet Radio dubbed it "dramatic". A further trailer teasing more storylines during the series was released on 8 August 2021. The Metro Duncan Lindsay thought the trailer was "explosive" and opined, "Relentless as ever, never take your eyes off Casualty!"

Filming 
The production protocols introduced at the beginning of production of the previous series were continued into series 36. These protocols ensured the safety of those working on the serial and included adhering to the physical distancing measures enforced by the British government. The measures require cast and crew to maintain a two-metre distance at all times. Preece told Sophie Dainty of Digital Spy that this was challenging as the show works on "close contact medicine, stunts and emotional exchanges", which was hard to film while adhering to physical distancing measures. To maintain distancing in scenes with multiple characters, plate shots were filmed. Each shot includes different actors, stood distanced, and in post-production, the shots were edited together to make it appear like one shot. Green screens were also used to make actors appear closer together than they were allowed to be. Producer Mat McHale confirmed that the difference would not be noticeable on-screen. Preece reiterated this and promised that the show had not "compromised" on its quality as a result of changes to filming.

During production, producers faced a challenge of face masks, which are compulsory in hospitals. Preece believed that after much exploration, these masks limited the emotion of scenes, so they were not worn all the time. Since the drama is set in a hospital, characters used personal protective equipment (PPE) as part of their costume. To avoid using NHS resources, Casualty sourced their PPE from an alternative supplier and despite this, it maintains effectiveness, allowing them to occasionally breach the physical distancing measures. Due to the protocols enforced, cast were required to apply their own makeup with verbal support from the makeup artists. The show regularly uses makeup-created injuries, such as cuts and bruises, but this was stopped due to the new protection measures. Additionally, to film kissing scenes, the show hired the partners of the actors to be body doubles. Due to their integral nature within the show's format, the use of stunts were not stopped; instead, additional work went to making the stunts safe to film. Oates and Preece agreed that often, stunts were easier to arrange than swapping props, due to the time and money involved in them.

Writing 
In September 2021, the serial, in collaboration with BBC Writersroom, launched a writing scheme asking frontline medical workers to create part of a script focusing on a consultant's "day from hell in the ED". Show bosses developed the scheme as part of a new innovative to maintain the accuracy of the show's storylines. Applications opened on 6 September and close on 20 October. Sathe expressed her excitement at the scheme and thought it gave medics the opportunity to see the television industry after Casualty has spent years inspiring viewers to join the medical industry. Jessica Loveland, the head of new writing at BBC Writersroom, expressed her delight at working with the drama and hoped to build on the "tradition of medical professionals translating their skills and understanding of human psychology into creative writing and storytelling".

Three medics-turned-writers were selected from the entries as winners of the competition: Samantha Bacchus, and writing duo Laura Griffiths and Chris Griffiths. Their win was announced on 14 April 2022. The writers join the show's shadow script team and will work on the special episode as well as developing future stories. Bacchus worked as a nurse on the front line of the NHS for over 15 years before becoming a full time novelist. She credits the drama with inspiring to enter nursing. Laura Griffiths has over 33 years experience in the NHS, while Chris Griffiths has experience as a paramedic and within trauma teams. Sarah Beeson, the show's script producer, praised the trio for their "authentic creative ambition and clear passion for Casualty". Bacchus, Griffiths and Griffiths all expressed their joy at working with the show's writing team on an episode.

Storyline development 
Casualty celebrates thirty-five years since its first episode on 6 September 2021 and producers marked the milestone with a feature-length opening episode. The episode is set a month after the conclusion of the previous series; the aftermath of the deaths of Fenisha Khatri (Olivia D'Lima) and Lev Malinovsky (Uriel Emil) is the focus point in the first half of the episode. The episode also contains scenes set in 2016, exploring a day in the ED which has dramatic consequences for the characters. For the episode, three former cast members - Richard Winsor, Tony Marshall (Noel Garcia) and Charles Dale (Big Mac) - reprised their roles as they were in the cast at the time. Preece expressed her excitement about the anniversary celebrations and described it as a "smorgasbord to offer both new and old fans of Casualty".

A press release for the series confirmed that Ethan Hardy (George Rainsford) and Jacob Masters (Charles Venn) would feature in stories which Preece dubbed "huge [and] heart-breaking". Rainsford said that filming this series was his "busiest time on the show" and teased "some big, juicy episodes". Ethan's story begins in the opening episode, following the death of Fenisha, who was his fiancée. It continues the exploration of his Huntington's disease diagnosis and how he copes as a newly-single father. Jacob's story is long-running and explores the topic of coercive control as he is abused by his partner, Tina Mollett (Adele James). The plot was heavily researched by production staff and the cast. Venn wanted to highlight the issue and that it is not "gender-specific". He praised the show for "tackling such a deeply-rooted issue" through his character, who he did not deem "aesthetically" vulnerable.

The death of Lev in the previous series also generated a new story for his estranged wife, Faith Cadogan (Kirsty Mitchell), who works to support their three young children. Jade Lovall's (Gabriella Leon) backstory is also explored, beginning with her reasoning for joining nursing in the opening episode. Writers created a new story for Jan Jenning (Di Botcher) and her wife, Ffion Morgan (Stirling Gallacher), as part of the series. On the story, Preece commented, "Their marriage is certainly pushed to its limits." In July 2021, Preece confirmed that the series would feature a two-part Christmas special, written by Barbara Machin, who she called "one of television's most prestigious writers".

Cast 
The thirty-sixth series of Casualty features a cast of characters working for the NHS within the emergency department of Holby City Hospital and the Holby Ambulance Service. Most cast members from the previous series reprise their roles in this series. William Beck appears as Dylan Keogh, a consultant in emergency medicine, while Di Botcher portrays Jan Jenning, the operational duty manager at Holby Ambulance Service. Jason Durr features as David Hide, a senior staff nurse, and Amanda Henderson appears as staff nurse Robyn Miller. Shaheen Jafargholi, Adele James and Gabriella Leon reprise their respective roles as staff nurses Marty Kirkby, Christina "Tina" Mollett, and Jade Lovall. Kirsty Mitchell stars as Faith Cadogan, an advanced clinical practitioner (ACP), and Neet Mohan appears as Rash Masum, a F1 doctor. Oli Okerafor portrays locum registrar Matthew Afolami, and George Rainsford plays consultant Ethan Hardy. Jacey Sallés stars as Rosa Cadenas, a healthcare assistant, and Michael Stevenson reprises his role as Iain Dean, a paramedic. Original cast member Derek Thompson appears as Charlie Fairhead, a senior charge nurse and emergency nurse practitioner. Charles Venn stars as Jacob Masters, the department's clinical nurse manager. Additionally, Stirling Gallacher appears in a recurring capacity as Ffion Morgan, a police officer.

Leon became the first cast member to leave the show during series 36. Her character Jade departs in episode five after deciding to quit nursing. James departed her role as Tina at the conclusion of her storyline. She made her final appearance in episode seven.

The opening episode of the series features appearances from former characters Cal Knight (Winsor), Noel Garcia (Marshall) and Mackenzie "Big Mac" Chalker (Dale). Their returns were announced on 14 July 2021. Winsor and Dale last appeared in series 31, while Marshall departed in the previous series. Both Cal and Noel were killed off as part of their original departures. Marshall expressed his excitement at reprising the role and "[tackling] yet another important subject". Dale stated that he was pleased to work with his co-stars again, and Winsor teased that his character would be "haunting Ethans  dreams and flashing back in time". Cal also appears in the second episode. Suzanne Packer reprised her role as nurse Tess Bateman in the series. The actress revealed her return in November 2021, and the character returns for episodes 14 and 15.

On 20 May 2021, it was announced that Elinor Lawless had been cast as Stevie Nash, an ED consultant. Lawless described her character as "a force to be reckoned with", while Preece called her "charismatic, contemporary, compelling and on occasion very unsettling". She added that Stevie would introduce "a new and dangerous energy into our world", creating "a new and exciting era for Casualty". The character debuts in the first episode. Milo Clarke's casting in the role of Teddy Gowan, a new paramedic, was announced on 10 August 2021. He is billed as Jan's excitable and enthusiastic nephew who has a dislike for Charlie. Clarke expressed his excitement at joining the cast and representing the NHS. He commented, "I hope his charm and zest are qualities viewers can enjoy." Sah Brockner, portrayed by Arin Smethurst, was introduced in episode seven. Smethurst billed their character as a "salty but fiercely compassionate" paramedic. Sah is the first non-binary regular character to appear in Casualty and Smethurst hoped that the representation would provide "a source of awareness for those who have never met someone like [them]".

The series features several recurring characters and multiple guest stars. The opening episode features Marshall's son in the guest role of Rudi, a patient in the ED. Episode one also features appearances from Lollie McKenzie and Paul Popplewell who reprise their respective roles as Natalia Malinovsky, Lev and Faith's daughter, and Paul Pegg, Robyn's love interest, from the previous series. Popplewell also appears in episode ten. Sophie Stone reprised her role as Susie Ashby, the biological mother of Jade, in episode five as part of Jade's departure storyline. As part of Rash's new story exploring gang violence, Zainab Hasan joined the guest cast in episode six as Hafsa Kazimi, a gang leader who shares a backstory with Rash. She appears in three episodes, concluding with her death in episode 13. Kriss Dosanjh reprised his guest role as Ashok Masum, Rash's father, in episodes 11 and 13 as part of the story. Comedian Rosie Jones reprised her role as patient Paula Kettering in episode 13. Jones was excited to play Paula again and explore an important story. Dainty (Digital Spy) confirmed in December 2021 that Jones would appear again during the following month. Raj Bajaj joined the recurring cast as social worker Adi Kapadia in episode 13. He features in Paula's story and acts as a love interest for Marty. Harry Collett, who has played David's son Ollie since series 28, returned for a stint of four episodes beginning in episode thirty-three and making his final appearance in episode thirty-nine at the conclusion of a school shooting storyline.

Main characters 
 William Beck as Dylan Keogh
 Di Botcher as Jan Jenning
 Milo Clarke as Theodore "Teddy" Gowan
 Jason Durr as David Hide
 Amanda Henderson as Robyn Miller
 Shaheen Jafargholi as Marty Kirkby
 Adele James as Christina "Tina" Mollett  (until episode 7)
 Shalisha James-Davis as Paige Allcott
 Elinor Lawless as Stevie Nash
 Gabriella Leon as Jade Lovall  (until episode 5)
 Kirsty Mitchell as Faith Cadogan
 Neet Mohan as Rash Masum
 Osi Okerafor as Matthew Afolami (until episode 32)
 George Rainsford as Ethan Hardy
 Jacey Sallés as Rosa Cadenas (until episode 27)
 Arin Smethurst as Sah Brockner (from episode 7)
 Michael Stevenson as Iain Dean
 Derek Thompson as Charlie Fairhead
 Charles Venn as Jacob Masters

Recurring characters 
 Raj Bajaj as Adi Kapadia
 Jaimi Barbakoff as Emma Nash (episodes 1–11)
 Lauren Crace as Chrissie Danes
 Stirling Gallacher as Ffion Morgan (episodes 3–43)
 Rosie Jones as Paula Kettering
 Narinder Simra as Pen Khatri (episodes 2–18)
 Adam Sina as Marcus Fidel (episodes 1, 41 and 43)

Guest characters 
 Harry Collett as Oliver Hide
 Charles Dale as Mackenzie "Big Mac" Chalker (episode 1)
 Kriss Dosanjh as Ashok Masum
 Alison Dowling as Ashley Khatri (episodes 2 and 18)
 Zainab Hasan as Hafsa Kazimi (episodes 6–13)
 Aurora Jones as Charlotte Miller
 Olivia D'Lima as Fenisha Khatri
 Tony Marshall as Noel Garcia (episode 1)
 Lollie McKenzie as Natalia Malinovsky (episode 1)
 Suzanne Packer as Tess Bateman
 Paul Popplewell as Paul Pegg (episodes 1–43)
 Steve Raine as Al Shipton (episodes 4 and 41)
 Sophie Stone as Susan Ashby (episode 5)
 Alex Walkinshaw as Adrian Fletcher
 Richard Winsor as Caleb "Cal" Knight (episodes 1–2)

Episodes

Notes

References

External links 
 Casualty series 36 at BBC Online
 Casualty series 36 at the Internet Movie Database

36
2021 British television seasons
2022 British television seasons